Sherpur Uparwar is a small village in Deegh Mandal in Sant Ravidas Nagar District in Uttar Pradesh State.

Demographics 
As of 2001 India census, Sherpur had a population of 296. Males constitute 49%(145)of the population and females 51%(151).

References 

Villages in Bhadohi district